Miskindzha is a rural locality (a selo) in Dokuzparinsky District, Republic of Dagestan, Russia. The population was 3,522 as of 2010. There are 18 streets.

Geography 
Miskindzha is located on the right bank of the Samur River, at the northern foot of Shalbuzdag, 7 km west of Usukhchay (the district's administrative centre) by road. Usukhchay and Dzhaba are the nearest rural localities.

Nationalities 
Lezgins live there.

References 

Rural localities in Dokuzparinsky District